Al Hazm or Al-Hazm may refer to:

Al Hazm (football club), a Saudi football team
Al Hazm Club Stadium, a Saudi football stadium
Al Hazm, Makkah, a village in Saudi Arabia
Al Hazm District, Yemen
Al Hazm, Yemen